Beauvallet is a 1929 novel written by Georgette Heyer.

Plot summary

The year is 1586 and 35-year-old Sir Nicholas Beauvallet (great great-great-grandson of Simon Beauvallet — Simon the Coldheart (1925)) is one of the most infamous pirates of the Elizabethan era. With the blessing of the Queen, Beauvallet sails the seas with the intention of plundering any Spanish ships that come his way. It is while thus occupied that he meets and falls in love with Doña Dominica de Rada y Sylva. He returns Doña Dominica and her father to Spain and vows that he will come back to claim her with total disregard of the danger that the Spanish Inquisition poses to a Protestant in a Catholic land.

Release details
1929, UK, William Heinemann (ISBN NA), Pub date ? ? 1929, hardback (First edition)
2006, UK, Arrow Books, Pub date 5 Jan 2006, paperback

1929 British novels
Novels by Georgette Heyer
Historical novels
Fiction set in the 1580s
Novels set in the 16th century
Heinemann (publisher) books
British romance novels
Historical romance novels
Longman books